Gunnar Rudberg (17 October 1880 – 6 August 1954) was an internationally renowned Swedish classical philologist. He was the father of geomorphologist Sten Rudberg.

Life 

In 1919, after being Associate Professor of Greek Language and Literature in Uppsala, Rudberg became Professor of Classical Philology in Oslo. From 1933 until his retirement in 1945 he was Professor of Greek Language and Literature in Uppsala.

Rudberg contributed to the scientific journal for Classical Philology Eranos – Acta philologica Suecana. With Samson Eitrem he edited the scientific journal Symbolæ osloenses.

Works 

 Poseidonios från Apameia (1916)
 Atlantis och Syrakusai (1917), English: Atlantis and Syracuse (2012) 
 Forschungen zu Poseidonios (1918)
 Kristus och Platon (1920)
 Platon, hans person och verk (1922)
 Poseidonios, en Hellenismens Lærer og Profet (1924)
 Kring Platons Phaidros (1924)
 Hellas och Nya Testamentet (1929)
 Platonica selecta, with Postscript of his son Folke Rudberg (1956, English)

External links 

 
 Biography in Nordisk Familjebok, 1926
 Biography in Svenskt biografiskt lexikon, 2012

1880 births
1954 deaths
Classical philologists
Members of the Royal Swedish Academy of Sciences
Swedish philologists
20th-century philologists